Nicholas George Gravenites (born October 2, 1938) is an American blues, rock and folk singer, songwriter, and guitarist, best known for his work with Electric Flag (as their lead singer), Janis Joplin, Mike Bloomfield and several influential bands and individuals of the generation springing from the 1960s and 1970s.  He has sometimes performed under the stage names Nick "The Greek" Gravenites and Gravy.

Biography
Gravenites was born in Chicago, into a Greek-speaking family; his parents were from Palaiochori, Arcadia, in Greece.  After his father died, he worked in the family candy store before he was enrolled at St. John's Northwestern Military Academy; he was expelled shortly before he was due to graduate.   He then attended the University of Chicago, met Paul Butterfield and Mike Bloomfield, became a fan of blues music, and learned guitar.

He regularly patronised clubs where Muddy Waters, Howlin' Wolf, Buddy Guy and other leading blues musicians played.  Gravenites spent time both in Chicago and San Francisco in the early 1960s.  He wrote the song "Born in Chicago", which became the opening track on the Paul Butterfield Blues Band debut album, and, with guitarist Bloomfield, co-wrote the title track of their second album, East-West; the band was inducted into the Rock and Roll Hall of Fame in 2015.

Gravenites played in clubs with Mike Bloomfield,  Charlie Musselwhite and others, and settled in San Francisco in the mid 1960s.   In 1967 he formed the Electric Flag with Bloomfield.  Gravenites also wrote the score for the film The Trip and produced the music for the film Steelyard Blues.   According to author and pop music critic Joel Selvin, Gravenites is "the original San Francisco connection for the Chicago crowd."

Gravenites is credited as a "musical handyman", helping such San Francisco bands as Quicksilver Messenger Service and Janis Joplin's first solo group, the Kozmic Blues Band. He wrote several songs for Joplin, including "Work Me, Lord" and the unfinished instrumental track "Buried Alive in the Blues".  Gravenites was the lead singer in the re-formed Big Brother and the Holding Company (without Joplin) from 1969 to 1972.  He also worked extensively with John Cipollina after producing the first album by Quicksilver Messenger Service. He and Cipollina formed the Nick Gravenites–John Cipollina Band, which toured throughout Europe.

Gravenites produced the pop hit "One Toke Over the Line" for Brewer & Shipley and the album Right Place, Wrong Time for Otis Rush, for which he was nominated for a Grammy Award. He and John Kahn produced the 1970 album Not Mellowed with Age, by Southern Comfort (CBS S 64125). Gravenites often used pianist Pete Sears in his band Animal Mind, including on his 1980 Blue Star album, on which Sears played keyboards and bass.

In the early 1980s, Gravenites performed and recorded with a revolving group of San Francisco Bay area rock, blues, and soul musicians called the Usual Suspects. Their first album, The Usual Suspects, was released in 1981. In the 1980s and 1990s, Gravenites played with Cipollina as Thunder and Lightning. Gravenites and Sears played together in front of 100,000 people on Earth Day 1990 at Crissy Field, San Francisco. Sears also joined him for a tour of Greece. Gravenites still performs live in northern California. Gravenites’ song "Born in Chicago" was honored by the Blues Hall of Fame in 2003. He has toured with the Chicago Blues Reunion and a new Electric Flag Band.

Gravenites is featured in the documentary film Born in Chicago, in which he and several other Chicago natives tell of growing up with blues music in Chicago. The film was shown at the SXSW festival in Austin, Texas, in 2013. He currently resides in Occidental, California.

Discography

Albums
 1967: Long Time Comin''', the Electric Flag
 1968: ‘’ Electric Flag’’, the Electric Flag
 1969: My Labors 1970: Be a Brother, Big Brother and the Holding Company
 1971: How Hard It Is, Big Brother and the Holding Company
 1972: Joplin in Concert 1973: Steelyard Blues OST 1980: Blue Star (Line Records)
 1981: The Usual Suspects 1982: Monkey Medicine, the Nick Gravenites–John Cipollina Band
 1991: Live at the Rodon, Nick Gravenites and John Cipollina (Music Box)
 1996: Don't Feed the Animals 1999: Kill My Brain 2005: Buried Alive in the Blues'' (live)

References

External links

Nick Gravenites profile at Bay Area Bands

1938 births
Living people
American male singer-songwriters
American rock singers
American blues singers
Singers from Chicago
American rock songwriters
American blues singer-songwriters
American people of Greek descent
Big Brother and the Holding Company members
The Electric Flag members
People from Occidental, California
Singer-songwriters from Illinois
Singer-songwriters from California